Matt Yallof (born September 24, 1968) is an American sports commentator for MLB Network and NHL Network, where he debuted June 3, 2009.  Yallof hosts the regular season studio show "The Rundown" and MLB Network Strike Zone. Yallof also appears on "MLB Tonight" and "Quick Pitch".

Previously, he was the lead host of the New York Mets pre- and post-game show as well as a fill-in host for 'The WheelHouse and Geico SportsNite'' on SportsNet New York. Before that, he worked at Comcast SportsNet Philadelphia, where he won four regional Emmy awards.  He also worked at WKBW-TV in Buffalo, New York, CNN and CNN/SI.

Yallof is a graduate of Muhlenberg College in Allentown, Pennsylvania.

On July 29, 2016, the 47-year-old Yallof suffered an Ischemic Stroke at his home in Armonk, New York. He spent a week in the ICU followed by a month in a rehab clinic, where he had to undergo physical, occupational and speech therapy. A couple of days after his stroke, 2 of his wife's friends set up a YouCaring page to help him with medical expenses, which was quickly passed around social media, and the page has raised $69,192 to help with the medical expenses. He made his first appearance back on MLB Network in April 2017, hosting MLB Network Strike Zone every Tuesday and Friday, which he will continue to do until further notice.

References

External links
 
 SportsNet New York

1968 births
Living people
People from Long Island
Muhlenberg College alumni
American sports announcers
Major League Baseball broadcasters
MLB Network personalities
Sports Emmy Award winners